The Bombers were a short lived Australian rock band consisting of Alan Lancaster, John Brewster, John Coghlan, Peter Heckenberg, Steve Crofts, Tyrone Coates.

Discography

Albums

Singles

References

Musical groups from Sydney
1988 establishments in Australia
1990 disestablishments in Australia
Musical groups established in 1988
Musical groups disestablished in 1990